German High Command may refer to:
German Imperial Naval High Command (Kaiserliches Oberkommando der Marine)
Oberste Heeresleitung (OHL, "Supreme Army Command") of the German Empire
Oberkommando der Wehrmacht (OKW, "Supreme Command of the Armed Forces") of Nazi Germany
Oberkommando des Heeres (OKH, "Supreme Command of the Army") of Nazi Germany
Oberkommando der Luftwaffe (OKL, "Supreme Command of the Air Force") of Nazi Germany
Oberkommando der Marine (OKM, "Supreme Command of the Navy") of Nazi Germany